Pajanelia, sometimes known in English as tender wild jack or pajanelia, in Malayalam as azhantha or pajneli, in Kannada as alangi and in Tamil as aranthal, is a monotypic genus of evergreen or briefly deciduous flowering tree in the family Bignoniaceae which contains a single species, Pajanelia longifolia.

Etymology
The genus epithet Pajanelia stems from a Malayalam name for the plant, pajaneli, recorded from Dutch Malabar in the 1670s (see Hortus Malabaricus). The species epithet longifolia is of Latin origin and means long leaves.

Description
Pajanelia grows as a small to medium sized tree with an upright habit, with few sideways branches. It can grow up to 30 metres (98.4 feet) tall. The compound, ovate and chartaceous leaves of Pajanelia are imparipinnate and glabrous with 7-17 leaflets. The rachis is triangular and glabrous. The tertiary nerves are broadly reticulate. Between January and June inflorescent panicles of purple flowers with yellow interiors are produced. They are silken along their margins and smell of soap. The flowers bloom at night before fading at dawn. It is winged on both margins. The seeds are housed within two valves and are flat, chartaceous and winged on both sides. The heartwood is white-brown coloured, and the pale grey outer bark is scaly and linearly lenticellate.

Distribution
This species can be most commonly found within the deciduous and semi-evergreen mountainous rainforests of India, Sri Lanka, Myanmar, Thailand, Peninsular Malaysia, Sumatra and Borneo, and up to 1000m above sea level. It is often spotted alongside rivers or within forests adjacent to the coast, and is occasionally found lonesome in the plains.

Uses
Pajanelia is used in parts of Malaysia, where it is commonly planted as stakes for hedges along rice fields, and is also planted as support tree in pepper plantations. The timber is suitable for woodworking purposes, such as building doors, wall panelling, domestic flooring, veneer and plywood, due to it being very hard and close grained. In conjunction with this, the wood has been used by the native Andamanese, who use the wood for house building, planking and canoe building. Pajanelia also has uses within traditional south Asian medicine. It may be resistant to white ant attacks, and is pollinated by various species of bats.

Gallery

References

External links

Bignoniaceae genera
Bignoniaceae
Flora of the Indian subcontinent
Flora of Myanmar
Flora of Thailand
Flora of Malesia
Medicinal plants of Asia
Monotypic Lamiales genera
Plants used in Ayurveda
Trees of Asia